Air Antwerp was a Belgian regional airline headquartered at Antwerp International Airport in Deurne.

History
The application for a flight license (AOC) for Air Antwerp was secured in 2019 by the Transport and Mobility department. On 9 August, Air Antwerp confirmed that the flight permit and operating permit had been received. The first flight operated on 9 September to London City Airport. A few former employees of VLM Airlines worked at Air Antwerp, helping with the preparatory work. The first aircraft, which was shown to the public on 27 July 2019, was previously part of the VLM Airlines fleet.

In October 2019, Air Antwerp joined the European Regions Airline Association.

In May 2021, CityJet handed all its shares to KLM. At the same time, Air Antwerp announced it would put its sole aircraft into storage with no plans to resume its scheduled route in the near future. In June 2021, Air Antwerp announced they would cease operations altogether.

Destinations 

Air Antwerp served the following destinations before suspending all services before the COVID-19 pandemic, and then finally ceasing operations.

Codeshare Agreements 
Air Antwerp had a codeshare agreement with KLM.

Fleet 
As of August 2019, Air Antwerp operated the following aircraft:

References

External links 

 

Defunct airlines of Belgium
Airlines established in 2019
Airlines disestablished in 2021
Companies based in Antwerp
Belgian companies established in 2019
2021 disestablishments in Belgium